Orangedale is an unincorporated community in Bee County, in the U.S. state of Texas. According to the Handbook of Texas, the community had a population of 35 in 2000. It is located within the Beeville micropolitan area.

History
The first settlers came to Orangedale in 1906 when a ranch named Wangeman was divided, and the fertile soil was good enough to use for planting orange trees and other fruits. Most of them came from the Northeastern United States. It was named Orangedale as a result of its abundance of oranges. Friendship Baptist Church was built in 1906 and eventually gained a store and a gas station. There was only one business and several scattered homes in Orangedale in 1948. The church and several houses remained in Orangedale in 1990 and had a population of 35 in 2000.

Geography

Education
Orangedale had two schools, one in 1906 and another in 1948. Today, the community is served by the Beeville Independent School District.

References

Unincorporated communities in Bee County, Texas
Unincorporated communities in Texas